"Poetic Justice" is an episode of the BBC sitcom Porridge. It aired on 25 February 1977. A new inmate arrives at the prison, and Fletcher is astounded that the inmate is the judge who sentenced him.

Synopsis 
The episode opens with Godber and Harris carrying a metal folding bed into Fletcher's cell. Predictably, Fletcher is not happy with the situation, but Mr Barrowclough tells him he has no choice due to the increase in crime and limited prison resources.

One of the new arrivals is taken straight away to meet the Governor. It turns out the man, Stephen Rawley, is an old friend of the Governor. Rawley is confident as he has an appeal coming through. The Governor is concerned because his friendship with Rawley might have negative consequences for him if anyone finds out. Although Rawley requests a single cell, the Governor denies this, wishing to prevent resentment from prisoners.

Mr Mackay escorts Rawley to meet his fellow inmates. Mackay warns the other prisoners to treat Rawley fairly. Godber welcomes Rawley into the prisoner's social circle, but Fletcher recognises Rawley immediately as the judge who sentenced him to Slade Prison. He wastes no time in taunting Rawley on his fall from grace. Rawley, on the other hand, does not initially recognise Fletcher. Although, Rawley then remembers Fletcher for his endless protestations of innocence, which Fletcher points out Rawley was "deaf to". Fletcher claims that with Rawley now in prison, this proves that he was not fit to sentence him in the first place. McLaren enquires as to what Rawley was sentenced for. Rawley states that the charges were:
 Being a party to criminal conspiracy
 Forgery of legal documents under the Forgery Act 1913 and 1948, and
 Accepting illicit payments as an Officer of the Crown

Fletcher dismisses this as "legal mumbo jumbo" and the true nature of the charges is bribery and corruption. McLaren believes that Rawley will get off due to his high-quality lawyer. Godber, however, finds Rawley's presence reassuring as it proves nobody is above the law. Mr Barrowclough makes it clear that Rawley will not receive any favours from him, although he does address Rawley as "your honour", much to the chagrin of the other inmates.

That evening, Godber makes Rawley's bed for him, which Fletcher claims Rawley must learn for himself. Godber tries to make Fletcher understand that Rawley is equal to them now he is a convict, but Fletcher will not change his mind. Rawley explains he has been allowed to keep his own toiletries and offers to share them with his new cellmates. He even agrees to abide by Fletcher's rules of his cell.

That night after lock-up, Rawley feels depressed now that prison seems real to him. Rawley explains to his new cellmates that the crimes he was convicted of were due to keeping up with the demands of his 19-year-old mistress.

The next morning, Mr Mackay asks Rawley if he slept alright. Fletcher complains that Mackay never asks him how he slept, but Mackay claims that Fletcher "sleeps soundly as he has no shame". Fletcher also points out that Rawley has been given a "cushy" job at Central Records despite being in prison for only one day.

That afternoon, Rawley is confronted by Harris, McLaren and an unknown man who push him into an empty cell. They prepare to attack him, but Fletcher intervenes and points out to the men that Rawley is a friend of the Governor. Fletcher reasons that a friend of the Governor is likely to make things comfortable for the men on their block.

That night after lock-up, Fletcher attempts to make Rawley comfortable by giving him a hot drink and Godber's pillow. Fletcher then talks to Rawley about his friendship with the Governor. However, Rawley says that whatever he knows about the Governor is in strictest confidence, so Fletcher takes back Godber's pillow. Although Fletcher does not bear Rawley any grudge, Fletcher admits his biggest regret was "what he did not know when he was sentenced"; had he known Rawley was corrupt, he would have tried to bribe him.

Episode cast

Notes 
 First appearance of Rawley. He is identified as the judge who sent Fletcher to prison. Although the voice of the judge is heard in the opening credits, the voiceover is provided by Ronnie Barker.

References 

Porridge (1974 TV series) episodes
1977 British television episodes